Machiko Suharmee Raheem (born ) is a Sri Lankan medal-winning swimmer who has represented her country at international competitions.
She represented Sri Lanka in the women's 50 m, 100 m and 200 m freestyle swimming events at the 2016 South Asian Games, winning a silver medal in the women’s 200 m freestyle event.

Raheem has broken records many times in her swimming career.
In 2007, she broke three records at the Pentathlon Swimming Championships (50 m back stroke, 50 m free style, and 200 m individual medley).
She set Sri Lankan national records for the 100 m, 200 m, and 400 m freestyle at the Sri Lankan National Aquatic Championships 2011. 
In the 2012 National Swimming Championship, she set three new national records and she beat the South Asian Games 200 m freestyle record, as well as being on the relay team that broke all five freestyle national records.
In 2014, she set another 200 m record at the Sri Lanka Schools Age Group Swimming Championship.

She attended high school at the Asian International School and was coached by Manoj Abeysinghe, before moving to Penn State.

References

1996 births
Living people
Sri Lankan female swimmers
Sri Lankan Malays
Swimmers at the 2014 Summer Youth Olympics
South Asian Games silver medalists for Sri Lanka
South Asian Games medalists in swimming
Sri Lankan female freestyle swimmers
Female backstroke swimmers